Robert Lamb may refer to:

Bobby Lamb (American football) (born 1962), college football coach
Bobby Lamb (trombonist) (born 1931), Irish jazz musician
Robert Lamb (bishop) (1703–1769), English churchman, bishop of Peterborough
Robert Lamb (footballer) (born 1955), former Australian rules footballer
Robert E. Lamb (born 1936), U.S. diplomat
Robert Lamb (martyr), one of the Perth Martyrs
Robert A. Lamb (born 1950), British American virologist